Ahmad ibn Qāsim Al-Hajarī also known as Al-Hajari, Afoukay, Chihab, Afokai or Afoqai (c.1570, Andalusia–c.1640, Tunis), was a Muslim Morisco who worked as a translator in Morocco during the reigns of the Saadi sultans, Ahmad al-Mansur, Zidan Abu Maali, Abu Marwan Abd al-Malik II and Al Walid ibn Zidan. He was later sent as an envoy by Sultan Zidan Abu Maali of Morocco who sent him to France and Netherlands to negotiate the release of some Moriscos who were captured by privateers and thrown on the shores of the mentioned countries.

Early life
Al-Hajari fled Spain for Morocco in 1599, following the persecutions of the Moriscos.

France (1610–11)

In 1610-11, the ruler of Morocco Mulay Zidan sent Al-Hajari to France in order to obtain redress on the subject of the Moriscos. He was involved in arms smuggling while in southern France, and visited Paris and Leiden. The reason for the visit to France seems to have been that some French corsairs, falsely offering a transit to Morocco to the Moriscos being expulsed from Spain after 1609, had instead captured them and their belongings. After sailing from Safi to Le Havre, Al-Hajari met with the King, and obtained a safe-conduct to visit the country. In Bordeaux he obtained some financial compensation from the shipowners who had been involved in the Moriscos affair.

Oriental studies

Al-Hajari met with the Orientalist Thomas Erpenius in September 1611 in Paris, and taught him some Classical Arabic. Through the introduction of Erpenius, Al-Hajari also met with the French Arabist Étienne Hubert d'Orléans, who had been a court physician for Moroccan ruler Ahmad al-Mansur in Marrakech from 1598 to 1601. Etienne Hubert offered to help him in his proceeding and to represent him "to all people of authority". Erpenius described Al-Hajari as:

They also discussed about religious subjects:

Low-Countries (1613)
In 1613, Al-Hajari visited the Dutch Republic, which he could visit freely due to the existence of a Treaty of Friendship. He stayed from June to September. He met an old acquaintance, the former Dutch Consul in Morocco Pieter Marteen Coy. He also discussed with the Dutch Prince Maurice of Orange the possibility of an alliance between the Dutch Republic, the Ottoman Empire, Morocco and the Moriscos, against the common enemy Spain. His book mentions the discussion for a combined offensive on Spain, as well as the religious reasons for the good relations between Islam and Protestantism at the time:

He then met with Erpenius there, as well as with the future explorer Peter Nuyts. In the series of Moroccan envoys to the Dutch Crown, Al-Hajari was preceded by Muhammad Alguazir, and succeeded by Yusuf Biscaino.

Later life
The later part of his life was devoted to translating religious texts from Arabic to Spanish for the benefit of the Moriscos diaspora.

His importance lies in his chronicling of his journey which also contains a part on his fleeing the Inquisition with his family. His chronicles are titled: The supporter of religion against disbelievers and the unsheathed sword on heathens (Kitāb Nāṣir al-dīn ʻalā ʼl-qawm al-kāfirīn, also shortened to Kitāb Nāṣir al-dīn), which he authored in 1037 AH/1637 CE at the request of a Tunisian Cheikh.

He seems to have died in Tunis in the 1640s.

See also
Islam and Protestantism

References

External links
Nabil I. Matar, In the Land of the Christians  (retrieved, August 5, 2010)

Moroccan translators
Moroccan writers
Year of death unknown
1570s births
1640s deaths
Moroccan diplomats
17th-century Moroccan people
16th-century Moroccan people
Ambassadors of Morocco to France
Ambassadors of Morocco to the Netherlands